Bratan may refer to

Places
Bratan (volcano) on Bali, Indonesia
Lake Bratan, a lake on Bali, Indonesia, near the volcano
Pura Ulun Danu Bratan, a temple on the shore of the lake on Bali, Indonesia

Given name
Bratan Tsenov (born 1964), Bulgarian Olympic wrestler

Surname
Alexandru Bratan (born 1977), weightlifter from Moldova
Eugen Bratan (born 1981), weightlifter from Moldova, brother of Alexandru